This a list of notable Mayors of Northampton, the county town of the county of Northamptonshire, England, since the first recorded mayoralty in 1215.

Pre-21st century
 1215: William Tilly (1st recorded mayor of Northampton)  
 1349 (prior to): Adam le Garlekmongere 
 1401-02: John Loudham (MP for Northampton, 1401) 
 1403-04: Thomas Overton  (MP for Northampton, 1397)
 1404-05: John Sywell (MP for Northampton, 1390) 
 1410-11: John Spring (MP for Northampton, 1399)
 1414-15: John Spring
 1416-17: John Loudham
 1430-31: William Rushden (MP for Northampton, 1411)  
 1514: Thomas Chipsey (founder of Northampton Grammar School) 
 1525-26: Lawrence Manley (MP for Northampton, 1529 and 1553) 
 1527: Thomas Chipsey 
 1532: Lawrence Washington (ancestor of George Washington) 
 1536-37: Lawrence Manley
 1545: Lawrence Washington
 1547-48: Lawrence Manley
 1550: Ralph Freeman (MP for Northampton, 1554) 
 1557: Lawrence Manley
 1558: Thomas Chipsey 
 1559-60: Edward Manley (MP for Northampton, 1558)   
 1566-67: Edward Manley
 1574-75: Edward Manley
 1642: ___ Fisher 
 1646: Peter Whalley (MP for Northampton, 1654) 
 1655-56: Peter Whalley
 1883: Sir Philip Manfield (MP for Northampton, 1891)
 1902-03: Alderman Thomas Purser (Liberal)
 1941-45: Walter William O'Donnell

21st century
Source:
 2000/01: Vivienne Patricia Dams
 2001/02: Timothy John Hadland
 2002/03: Michael Geoffrey Boss
 2003/04: Terence George Wire
 2004/05: Barry William Massey
 2005/06: Sally Beardsworth
 2006/07: Colin Lill
 2007/08: Lee Mason
 2008/09: Brian Markham
 2009/10: Michael Hill
 2010–11: Marianne Taylor
 2011/12: Jamie Lane
 2012/13: Roger Conroy
 2013/14: Les Marriott
 2014/15: John Caswell
 2015/16: Penelope Flavell
 2016/17: Christopher Malpas
 2017/18: Gareth Eales
 2018/19: Tony Ansell
 2019/20: Nazim Choudary
 2020/21: Brian Sargeant
 2021/22: Rufia Ashraf

References

Northamptonshire-related lists
Northampton